Slovak Performing Rights Society (SOZA) is a performance rights organisation representing local groups of copyright and related rights owners of Slovakia.

A member of CISAC (1970), BIEM (1973) and GESAC (2005), SOZA was initially founded as Slovenský autorský sväz hudobných skladateľov, spisovateľov a nakladateľov (SAS), or else Slovak Union of Authors for Composing, Writing and Publishing in 1939.

See also
 List of copyright collection societies

External links
 Official site (in Slovak and English)

Organizations established in 1939
Music organisations based in Slovakia
Music licensing organizations